Sées station (French: Gare de Sées) is a railway station serving the town Sées, Orne department, northwestern France.

Services

The station is served by regional trains to Argentan, Caen and Le Mans.

References

Railway stations in Orne
Railway stations in France opened in 1858